Tajuria culta, also called the black-branded royal, is a species of lycaenid or blue butterfly found in the Indomalayan realm (Assam, Burma, Thailand).

References

Tajuria
Butterflies described in 1896